C.T. Jasper, is a Polish artist.

Born Christian Tomaszewski in 1971, Gdańsk, (Poland), he has presented his works under the pseudonym of C.T. Jasper since 2013. He graduated from the Academy of Fine Arts in Poznań in 1996. He lives in Brooklyn, New York and teaches in the Sculpture department at Tyler School of Art.

Work 
C.T. Jasper's primary artistic medium is video, including elements of science-fiction literature and modern communist utopias. 

Works include the installation entitled Erased (2012) which uses cinematographic images. The work consists of three videos with sound in an empty gallery space. Erased was first shown at Le Guern Gallery in Warsaw, Poland in 2012. In 2013, the work was shown at The Standard, in Hollywood, and then in 2015 at the Museum of Art in Łódź at a joint exhibition with Joanna Malinowska entitled Związki rozwiązki/ Relations Disrelations. The artist digitally modified two movies erasing all human presence from the segments of the films Blue Velvet by David Lynch and The Tin Drum by Volker Schlöndorff. A third video was a looped excerpt from Stanley Kramer's 1995 drama On the Beach, played on a computer screen at the gallery's reception desk. Vacant gallery space merged with film space becoming one undefined place.

The work Sunset of the Pharaohs was first prepared for the Frieze Art Fair in New York (2014). The artist digitally erased all the protagonists from the Polish movie Pharaoh, directed by Jerzy Kawalerowicz (1965), which was an adaptation from the 19th Century novel by Bolesław Prus. The video projection was played inside an architectural structure covered with sheep skins, recalling a nomadic lifestyle. The shape was reminiscent of a camera's bellows. Jasper's technique involved digital removal of the human presence in the Sunset of the Pharaohs.

In 2015, C.T. Jasper, in collaboration with Joanna Malinowska and curator Magdalena Moskalewicz, prepared a project entitled Halka / Haiti: 18° 48'05" N 72° 23'01" W, commissioned by Zacheta, Museum of Contemporary Polish Art in Warsaw, Poland. It was presented at the Polish Pavilion at the 56th International Art Exhibition, Venice Biennale. The key inspiration for artists was Werner Herzog's movie Fitzcarraldo, which main protagonist plans to build an opera in the middle of Amazonian forest. Jasper's and Malinowska's project refers to this act in a critical way and deals with an issue of cultural colonization and oppression of European empires.
Jasper and Malinowska decided to stage the opera Halka by Stanisław Moniuszko, in the town of Cazale, Haiti - a place inhabited by the descendants of the Polish soldiers from Napoleon's legions. The film screening followed by a discussion with the artists was also included in the program of Göteborg International Biennial for Contemporary Art in 2015.
In the same year C.T. Jasper and Joanna Malinowska began work on the project Bureau of Masks Inventory which was shown at the exhibition Daily and Religious Rituals curated by Michał Jachuła at the Arsenał Gallery in Białystok in Poland. 
Since 2016 they have been working on a sound piece entitled The Emperor's Canary for the High Line in New York City. The installation comprises two gramophones inspired by Werner Herzog's film Fitzcarraldo. The first one plays a recording of the Great Pacific garbage patch, and the second gramophone plays a recording of a person with black lung disease. These two sounds represent the crisis in people's relationship to the environment.

Collections 
Jasper's works appear in public and private collections in Poland and abroad: 
 Museum of Art in Łódź
 Zachęta National Gallery of Art in Warsaw
 ING Polish Art Foundation
 Hirshhorn Museum in Washington

Exhibitions 
C.T. Jasper has had solo exhibitions at SculptureCenter, New York City; Tufts University Art Gallery, Boston, Massachusetts; Michael Wiesehoefer Gallery, Cologne, Germany; Frieze Art Fair, New York; Museum of Art, Lodz, Poland (with Joanna Malinowska); Polish Pavilion at La Biennale di Venezia - 56th International Art Exhibition; Contemporary Art Centre, Vilnius, and Analix Forever, in collaboration with Joanna Malinowska, Geneva, Switzerland. Group exhibitions include Irish Museum of Modern Art, Dublin, Ireland; The Bronx Museum of the Arts, New York City; Centre for Contemporary Art Ujazdowski Castle, Warsaw, Poland;  Performa ’09 –the Third Biennial of Performance Art, New York City; Athens Biennale, Greece; Museo de Arte Carrillo Gil, Mexico City, Mexico; National State Gallery, Gdańsk, Poland; International Biennial for Contemporary Art, Göteborg, Sweden; Salzburger Kunstverein, Salzburg, Austria; The Hirshhorn Museum and Sculpture, Garden, Washington, D.C.; and The Australian Centre for Contemporary Art, Melbourne, Australia.

References

External links 
 Official website of C.T. Jasper
 C.T. Jasper at Le Guern Gallery's website
 C.T. Jasper at Culture.pl
 C.T. Jasper and Joanna Malinowska at Biennial Foundation's website
 C.T. Jasper and Joanna Malinowska at Zacheta National Gallery of Art, Warsaw, Poland
 La Biennale di Venezia
 Museum of Art, Łódź
 Arsenał Gallery, Białystok, Poland
 C.T. Jasper's Biography at Tyler School of Art's website

Artists from Gdańsk
Living people
Artists from New York City
Video artists
Polish contemporary artists
1971 births